Megachile pruina, also known as the Hoary Leafcutter Bee, is a species of bee in the family Megachilidae. It was described by Smith in 1853.

Distribution 
It is found from North Carolina to Florida and Texas.  It is also considered native to the islands of Bermuda.

References

Pruina
Insects described in 1853